A professional wrestling promotion is a company or business that regularly performs shows involving professional wrestling that has little relationship to the rules of the amateur olympic form. "Promotion" also describes a role which entails management, advertising and logistics of running a wrestling event (see promoter). Within the convention of the show, the company is a sports governing body which sanctions wrestling matches and gives authority to the championships and is responsible for maintaining the divisions and their rankings. In truth, the company serves as a touring theatre troupe, as well as event promotion body for its own events.

Most promotions are self-contained, organized around one or more championships and do not acknowledge or recognize the legitimacy of other promotions' titles unless they share a working agreement. Governing bodies, such as the CyberFight, United Wrestling Network, WWNLive, Allied Independent Wrestling Federations, Pro Wrestling International and, previously, the National Wrestling Alliance, act as an umbrella organization which governs titles that are shared among multiple promotions. During the 1950s, the National Wrestling Alliance oversaw many wrestling territories such as Mid-Atlantic Wrestling and NWA San Francisco, in a business model known as the "territory system".

This is a list of the most notable past and present professional wrestling promotions.

Australia
Active
Australasian Wrestling Federation
Explosive Pro Wrestling 
Impact Pro Wrestling Australia
International Wrestling Australia
Melbourne City Wrestling
Riot City Wrestling
World Series Wrestling

Defunct
I-Generation Superstars of Wrestling
Pro Wrestling Women's Alliance
World Championship Wrestling
World Wrestling All-Stars

Canada

Active
Border City Wrestling
Elite Canadian Championship Wrestling
Great Canadian Wrestling
High Impact Wrestling Canada
International Wrestling Syndicate
Northern Championship Wrestling
nCw Femmes Fatales
Prairie Wrestling Alliance
Real Canadian Wrestling

Defunct
BSE Pro
Eastern Sports Association
Hart Legacy Wrestling
International Wrestling Alliance
Lutte Internationale
Maple Leaf Wrestling
Maximum Pro Wrestling
NWA: All-Star Wrestling
Stampede Wrestling

Japan

Active

Action Advance Pro Wrestling
All Japan Pro Wrestling
Big Japan Pro Wrestling
CyberFight(umbrella brand)
DDT Pro-Wrestling
Pro Wrestling Noah
Tokyo Joshi Pro Wrestling
Ganbare Pro-Wrestling
Dradition
Dragon Gate
Frontier Martial-Arts Wrestling
Ice Ribbon
Ladies Legend Pro-Wrestling
Lion's Gate Project
Michinoku Pro Wrestling
New Japan Pro-Wrestling
Osaka Pro Wrestling
Oz Academy
Pro-Wrestling Basara
Pro Wrestling Noah
Pro Wrestling Wave
Pro Wrestling Zero1 
Pure-J
Real Japan Pro Wrestling
Seadlinnng
Sendai Girls' Pro Wrestling
Tokyo Gurentai
World Wonder Ring Stardom

Defunct

All Japan Women's Pro-Wrestling
Apache Pro-Wrestling Army
Arsion
Battlarts
Diamond Ring 
Federacion Universal de Lucha Libre
Fighting Network Rings 
Gaea Japan
Global Professional Wrestling Alliance
Hustle
Inoki Genome Federation
International Wrestling Enterprise
IWA Japan 
Japan Pro-Wrestling
Japan Women's Pro-Wrestling
Japan Wrestling Association
Jd'
JWP Joshi Puroresu
Kingdom
NEO Japan Ladies Pro-Wrestling
Never (professional wrestling)
Pro Wrestling Fujiwara Gumi
Riki Pro (WJ)
Smash
Super World of Sports
Tenryu Project
Tokyo Pro Wrestling
Universal Wrestling Federation
Union Pro Wrestling
UWF International
Wrestle Association "R"
Wrestling International New Generations
Wrestle-1
Wrestling New Classic

Mexico

Active
Alianza Universal De Lucha Libre
Lucha Libre AAA Worldwide(Triple A)
Consejo Mundial de Lucha Libre
International Wrestling Revolution Group
The Crash Lucha Libre
Toryumon Mexico

Defunct
International Wrestling League
Los Perros del Mal
Lucha Libre Elite
Nación Lucha Libre
Promo Azteca
Universal Wrestling Association
World Wrestling Association
Xtreme Latin American Wrestling

United Kingdom & Ireland

Active

4 Front Wrestling
All Star Wrestling
Attack! Pro Wrestling
Bellatrix Female Warriors
Fight Factory Pro Wrestling
Grand Pro Wrestling
Insane Championship Wrestling
Irish Whip Wrestling
Lucha Britannia
New Generation Wrestling
NXT UK (WWE brand)
One Pro Wrestling
Over the Top Wrestling
Premier British Wrestling
Preston City Wrestling
Progress Wrestling
Pro-Wrestling: EVE
Revolution Pro Wrestling
Welsh Wrestling

World Association of Wrestling (WAW)
World of Sport Wrestling

Defunct
5 Star Wrestling
All England Championship
British Wrestling Federation (Orig Williams Version)
Frontier Wrestling Alliance
International Pro Wrestling: United Kingdom(IPW:UK)
Joint Promotions
Pro Wrestling Pride 
X Wrestling Alliance

United States 

Active

All American Wrestling
All Elite Wrestling
All Pro Wrestling
!Bang!
Chaotic Wrestling
Combat Zone Wrestling
East Coast Wrestling Association
Empire Wrestling Federation
Funking Conservatory
Game Changer Wrestling
Harley Race's Wrestling Academy
House of Hardcore
Impact Wrestling
Independent Wrestling Association Mid-South
Juggalo Championship Wrestling
Lucha VaVOOM
Major League Wrestling
MCW Pro Wrestling
Millennium Wrestling Federation
National Wrestling Alliance
New England Championship Wrestling
Northeast Wrestling
Ohio Valley Wrestling
Pro Wrestling Guerrilla
Reality of Wrestling
Revolutionary Championship Wrestling
Ring of Honor
Shimmer Women Athletes
Southern States Wrestling
Texas All-Star Wrestling
Texas Wrestling Alliance
Top Rope Promotions
Ultra Championship Wrestling-Zero
United Wrestling Network(governing body)
Championship Wrestling from Hollywood
Warrior Wrestling
West Coast Wrestling Connection
Women Superstars United
Women of Wrestling
World League Wrestling
World Wrestling Network(governing body)
Full Impact Pro
Shine Wrestling
World Xtreme Wrestling
WWE
Raw
SmackDown
NXT

Defunct (Modern-era)

American Wrestling Federation
Assault Championship Wrestling
Century Wrestling Alliance
Chikara
CWF Mid-Atlantic Wrestling
Deep South Wrestling
Dragon Gate USA
Extreme Championship Wrestling
Extreme Rising
Evolve
Family Wrestling Entertainment
Florida Championship Wrestling
Front Row Wrestling
Future of Wrestling
Global Force Wrestling
Hardcore Homecoming
Heartland Wrestling Association
Hulk Hogan's Celebrity Championship Wrestling
Incredibly Strange Wrestling
Independent Professional Wrestling Alliance
Independent Wrestling Federation
IWF Promotions
Jersey All Pro Wrestling
Lucha Libre USA
Lucha Underground
Main Event Championship Wrestling
Mason-Dixon Wrestling
Memphis Championship Wrestling
Memphis Wrestling(governing body)
Mid-Eastern Wrestling Federation
Naked Women's Wrestling League
National Championship Wrestling
OMEGA Championship Wrestling
Phoenix Championship Wrestling
Power League Wrestling
Pro-Pain Pro Wrestling
Resistance Pro Wrestling
Rise Wrestling
Southern Championship Wrestling
Steel City Wrestling
Texas Wrestling Alliance
Turnbuckle Championship Wrestling
Ultimate Pro Wrestling
Warriors 4 Christ Wrestling
Women of Wrestling
Wrestling Society X
Wrestling Superstars Live
Wrestlicious
Xcitement Wrestling Federation
Xtreme Pro Wrestling
World Wide Wrestling Alliance
World Women's Wrestling
World Wrestling Stars
World Wrestling Legends
WrestleReunion

Defunct (Territory-era)

All-Star Championship Wrestling
American Wrestling Association
Championship Wrestling from Florida
Championship Wrestling from Georgia
Continental Championship Wrestling
Continental Wrestling Association
Georgia Championship Wrestling
Global Wrestling Federation
Gorgeous Ladies of Wrestling
Heart of America Sports Attractions
International Championship Wrestling
International World Class Championship Wrestling
International Wrestling Association
International Wrestling Federation
Jim Crockett Promotions
Ladies Professional Wrestling Association
Mid-South Wrestling
Minneapolis Boxing and Wrestling Club
National Wrestling Association(governing body)
National Wrestling Federation
Pacific Northwest Wrestling
Powerful Women of Wrestling
Pro Wrestling America
Pro Wrestling USA
Smoky Mountain Wrestling
Southern Championship Wrestling (Georgia)
Southwest Championship Wrestling
St. Louis Wrestling Club
United States Wrestling Association
Universal Wrestling Federation
Windy City Pro Wrestling
World Championship Wrestling
World Class Championship Wrestling
World Wrestling Association
World Wrestling Network
Worldwide Wrestling Associates

Other

Active
 Africa Wrestling Alliance
 All Wrestling Organization
 Brazilian Wrestling Federation
 Continental Wrestling Entertainment
 Impact Pro Wrestling
 Irish Whip Wrestling
 Israeli Pro Wrestling Association
 IWA Puerto Rico
 La Liga Wrestling
 New Zealand Wide Pro Wrestling
 Oriental Wrestling Entertainment
 Philippine Wrestling Revolution
 Singapore Pro Wrestling
 Southern Pro Wrestling
 Westside Xtreme Wrestling
 WWC
 World Wrestling Professionals
 Vietnam Pro Wrestling

Defunct
 Catch Wrestling Association
 Dominion Wrestling Union
 Ring Ka King
 Israeli Wrestling League
 Ultimate Wrestling Israel

See also
List of professional wrestling rosters
List of women's wrestling promotions

References

External links
List Of All Promotions at Cagematch.net
Promotions at OWW.com
Wrestlingdata.com
The Internet Wrestling Database

 
Promotions